Inga sertulifera is a species of plant in the family Fabaceae. It is found from Costa Rica through Peru and Bolivia.

References

External links

sertulifera